Flavio Gabriel Zandoná (born April 8, 1967), nicknamed Chino (Chinese), is a former Argentine footballer who played most of his career for Vélez Sársfield of the Argentine Primera, winning 8 honours with the club.  He was born in Zárate, Buenos Aires Province.

Playing career
Zandoná started playing for San Lorenzo in 1994 as a centre back. He later transferred to Vélez Sársfield where he was almost exclusively used as a right back. Zandoná won 8 titles with Vélez, including the 1994 Copa Libertadores and Intercontinental Cup.

Zandoná was known for his aggressive style on and off the field. Playing with Vélez in the 1995 Supercopa Sudamericana he punched Flamengo's striker Edmundo after a short slap exchange. Later, in 1998, he punched a rival fan who had insulted him after seeing the red card in Vélez' game against Racing.

Honours
Vélez Sársfield
 Primera División Argentina (3): 1995 Apertura, 1996 Clausura, 1998 Clausura
 Copa Libertadores (1): 1994
 Intercontinental Cup (1): 1994
 Copa Interamericana (1): 1994
 Supercopa Sudamericana (1): 1996
 Recopa Sudamericana (1): 1997

References

External links
 Argentine Primera statistics at Fútbol XXI 
 

1967 births
Sportspeople from Buenos Aires Province
Argentine footballers
Argentine expatriate footballers
Association football defenders
San Lorenzo de Almagro footballers
Club Atlético Vélez Sarsfield footballers
C.D. Veracruz footballers
Cerro Porteño players
Argentine Primera División players
Expatriate footballers in Paraguay
Expatriate footballers in Mexico
Argentine expatriate sportspeople in Mexico
Expatriate footballers in Japan
J1 League players
Avispa Fukuoka players
Living people